This is a list of cobblestone buildings, mostly houses and mostly but not all in the United States, that are notable and that reflect cobblestone architecture.  Cobblestone architecture had some popularity for substantial homes and other buildings for a period, but is limited in scope of employment.

In Europe, cobblestone architecture includes the use of flint cobbles.  St. Alban's Church, Copenhagen, in Denmark, was designed as a traditional English church by architect Arthur Blomfield.  Gothic Revival in style, it is built in limestone from the Faxe south of Copenhagen, knapped flint from Stevns, Åland stone for the spire, and roof tiles from Broseley in Shropshire. The conspicuous use of flint as a building material, unusual in Denmark, is another typical trait from England where it is commonly seen in church buildings in the south of the country, particularly East Anglia.

In the United States, cobblestone architecture appears most significantly in New York State, and within the state generally along the Erie Canal, following from the economic prosperity brought by the canal and from the ease of transportation by barges of this heavy building material.  There are numerous examples in other states as well. A number of cobblestone houses and other buildings are listed on the U.S. National Register of Historic Places.

List
Notable cobblestone buildings include:

in the United States
(by state then city)

Colorado

Illinois
The area around the Illinois-Wisconsin border once had the largest population of cobblestone houses outside of New York City. However, very few remain—the Illinois Historic Sites Survey in 1978 identified only two remaining. Cobblestone houses were popular among individuals who worked on the Erie Canal, and the style came to the border region from New York migrants.

Montana

New Mexico

New York

Ohio

Washington
The Basalt Cobblestone Quarries District contains seven historic quarries which provided cobblestones for Portland streets.

Wisconsin

References

See also
 Cobblestone
 List of cobblestone streets

 
Cobblestone buildings